Melançon is a French surname which is often spelled Mélançon, Melancon or Melanson in English.  Notable people with the surname include:

André Melançon (1942-2016), Canadian actor, screenwriter and film director
Charlie Melançon (born 1947), U. S. representative for Louisiana
Claude Mélançon (1895-1973), Canadian naturalist, lecturer and author (novelist and journalist)
Gerard Melancon (born 1967), American thoroughbred jockey
Isabelle Melançon, Canadian politician
Joliane Melançon (born 1986), Canadian judoka
Larry Melancon (born 1955), American thoroughbred jockey
Mark Melancon (born 1985), American professional baseball pitcher
Meiling Melançon (born 1980), American actress, writer, director and producer
Pierre-Yves Melançon, Canadian politician 
Robert Melançon (born 1947), Canadian writer
Tucker L. Melancon (born 1946), American judge
Rydell Melancon (born 1962), American football player

See also
Claude-Mélançon Ecological Reserve, in Québec
Melançon Arena, an indoor arena located in Saint-Jérôme, Québec
Melanson

French-language surnames